Saint Stephen is a 2.6 m high bronze statue of saint Stephen by Lorenzo Ghiberti, completed for the Arte della Lana guild in 1427–28. It is now in the Museo di Orsanmichele, although a replica fills its original niche on the exterior of Orsanmichele, where it was one of a cycle of fourteen sculptures, each showing the patron saint of one of the guilds of Florence.

Bibliography (in Italian)
Paola Grifoni, Francesca Nannelli, Le statue dei santi protettori delle arti fiorentine e il Museo di Orsanmichele, Quaderni del servizio educativo, Edizioni Polistampa, Firenze 2006.
Giulia Brunetti, Ghiberti, Sansoni, Firenze 1966.

1428 sculptures
Sculptures of Orsanmichele
Bronze sculptures in Florence